Hathor 18 - Coptic Calendar - Hathor 20

The nineteenth day of the Coptic month of Hathor, the third month of the Coptic year. On a common year, this day corresponds to November 15, of the Julian Calendar, and November 28, of the Gregorian Calendar. This day falls in the Coptic season of Peret, the season of emergence. This day falls in the Nativity Fast.

Commemorations

Saints 

 The martyrdom of Saint Abibus

Other commemorations 

 The consecration of the Church of Saints Sergius and Bacchus 
 The commemoration of the Preaching of Saint Bartholomew the Apostle in El-Kharga

References 

Days of the Coptic calendar